Tantondresswara Temple is an ancient temple located in Nedungadu, Karaikal district, Puducherry Union territory. This temple was constructed by the Chola rulers , who dedicated this temple to Shiva. This temple from 1971 is regarded as protected monument.

History
Tantondresswara Temple was constructed by the rulers of Chola. The main deity of the temple is Tantondreeswara (Lord Shiva). The area of Nedungadu got its name from Nedunthuyar Theertha Nayaki, the consort of Tantondreeswara. Her name means the one who redressed the long grievances of the people.

Protected Monument
In 1948, architectural excavations were conducted in this temple. The officials excavated about 14 Bronze sculptures belonging to 14th century. The excavated bronze idols were of Thirugnanasambandhar, Lord Vinayaga, Manickavasagar, Lord Murugan, Goddess Uma and dancing postures of Lord Shiva such as Aanandha Thandavam. This temple from 1971 is regarded as a protected monument.

Architecture
The entire temple is made up of Red sandstone. The sanctum enshrines the tall idol of Shivalinga which is the main deity, Tantondreeswara. The temple has many inscriptions in the outer walls of the sanctum.

References

Karaikal district
Shiva temples in Puducherry